Paul Hecht (born August 16, 1941) is an English-born Canadian stage, film, and television actor known for playing radio newsman Ross Buckingham in Howard Stern's Private Parts.

Life and career
Born in London, England, Hecht graduated from the National Theatre School of Canada in 1963. He made his Broadway debut in 1968 in Rosencrantz & Guildenstern Are Dead, for which he was nominated for the Tony Award for Best Performance by a Featured Actor in a Play. Additional Broadway credits include 1776 (as John Dickinson ), The Rothschilds, The Great God Brown, Herzl, Caesar and Cleopatra, Noises Off, and The Invention of Love. He received the Obie Award for his performance in the off-Broadway production of Enrico IV in 1989.

Hecht lends his voice to the army veterinarian in the 2010 animated film My Dog Tulip. He played Emperor Palpatine for the radio drama adaptions of The Empire Strikes Back and Return of the Jedi. Hecht was a regular performer on Himan Brown's CBS Radio Mystery Theater between 1974 and 1982.

Hecht's extensive television credits include the recurring role of Allie's ex-husband Charles on Kate & Allie, frequent guest shots on Law & Order, Law & Order: Special Victims Unit, As the World Turns, Starsky & Hutch, Remington Steele, Miami Vice, and Queer as Folk.

Hecht has performed with the Philadelphia Orchestra, the Allentown Symphony, at the 92nd Street Y, and performs a program of John Donne sonnets with the early music group Parthenia. He has recorded many books for Recorded Books and Audible.

Hecht was president of the New York chapter of the Screen Actors Guild from 1991 to 1995.

References

External links

www.recordedbooks.com

1941 births
Audiobook narrators
English emigrants to Canada
Canadian male musical theatre actors
Canadian male stage actors
Canadian male film actors
Canadian male television actors
Living people
Male actors from London
National Theatre School of Canada alumni
Canadian expatriates in the United States